The Fleet Street Reports: Cases in Intellectual Property Law is a monthly journal published by Sweet & Maxwell since 1963 and covering intellectual property law. The language of publication is English.

See also 
 List of intellectual property law journals

References 

Intellectual property law journals
British law journals
Publications established in 1963
English-language journals
Monthly journals